Steve O'Callaghan is an Australian former professional rugby league footballer who played in the 1980s.  O'Callaghan played for Canberra in the NSWRL competition.  O'Callaghan was a foundation player for Canberra playing in the club's first ever game.

Playing career
In 1982, O'Callaghan joined newly admitted Canberra and played in the club's first ever game, a 37–7 loss against South Sydney at Redfern Oval.

O'Callaghan played in the club's first win, a 12–11 victory over Newtown at Seiffert Oval with O'Callaghan kicking a goal from the sideline to win the match.

Canberra would only go on to win 4 games in 1982 and finished last on the table claiming the wooden spoon.  As of 2019, this is the only time that Canberra has finished last.

O'Callaghan played with Canberra until the end of the 1987 season before retiring and was not a part of the club's maiden grand final appearance against Manly.

Post playing
O'Callaghan went on to work for the Australian Federal Police in Canberra.

References

Canberra Raiders players
Australian rugby league players
Rugby league wingers
Rugby league fullbacks
Living people
1959 births
Place of birth missing (living people)